Elizabeth Islas Brasdefer (born July 17, 1946 in Pachuca de Soto, Hidalgo, Mexico) is a Mexican telenovela actress who is better known as Claudia Islas. She is very famous for her beauty and was called "Mexican Brigitte Bardot" in the past. She acted in the last decade of the Golden Age of Mexican cinema.

Biography
Claudiaʻs surname Islas means "islands". She is a daughter of Luis Roberto Islas and María Luisa Brasdefer. She is married to Jaime Bravo.

One of her best known roles was that of Amparo de Garcés del Valle in Marisol with Erika Buenfil, who played her niece-in-law, Marisol.

 she lives in Miami and is retired. Her last work was in the telenovela Ángel Rebelde in 2004.

She sold her jewelry because she fell into poverty.

Controversies 
After the death of Juan Gabriel in 2016, the actress Carmen Salinas revealed that he would have confessed to his son Pedro Plascencia Salinas —who was Juan Gabriel's musician— that Claudia Islas would have been the person who accused him of theft after a party at his house in 1969. The fact caused Juan Gabriel to remain imprisoned for 18 months in the Lecumberri Palace. In life, Juan Gabriel never revealed the name of the person who had accused him. The actress denied the accusations.

Filmography

References

Mexican telenovela actresses
Mexican film actresses
People from Pachuca
1946 births
Living people
Mexican emigrants to the United States